Watergate Marina is located on the north bank of the Mississippi River in Saint Paul, Minnesota, United States, upriver from the city's downtown area. Owned by the City of Saint Paul and operated via lease, the privately run, full-service marina has capacity for 160 ships and it charges fees for boat launches.

Amenities 
On the Mississippi, the marina's boat ramp is located at river mile 844.8L, on the opposite bank of Pike Island. The marina is located within Crosby Farm Regional Park and is accessed on land via Shepard Road, just west of Davern Avenue, in Saint Paul. 

The area of the two parks features  of riverfront shoreline and is within the Mississippi National River and Recreation Area. In 2013, long-term plans by the City of Saint Paul called for redevelopment of the marina with an environmental education center and multi-use access points to the river.

See also 
 History of Saint Paul, Minnesota
 Upper Mississippi River

References

External links 
 Watergate Marina

Buildings and structures in Saint Paul, Minnesota
Marinas in the United States
Mississippi National River and Recreation Area